Lawry's Seasoned Salt is a seasoned salt widely used in the United States. Before its retail introduction in 1938, it was used exclusively by Lawry's The Prime Rib Restaurant in Beverly Hills, where the seasoning was created. The brand is now owned by McCormick & Company. Lawry's was the first seasoned salt to hit the market; seasoned salts are now said to outsell regular table salt in the United States.

History
The seasoning was originally formulated by Lawrence Frank, original owner of the Tam O'Shanter and Lawry's The Prime Rib Restaurant, where the seasoning was used and sold to patrons of Lawry's. In 1938, Lawry's began marketing its seasoned salt in retail stores; now many kinds of seasonings and flavorings are sold under the Lawry's name.

The Lawry's product lines were sold to Lipton/Unilever in 1979. In July 2008 they were again sold, to McCormick & Company.

One of Richard Nixon's favorite snacks was cottage cheese sprinkled with Lawry's.

References

Further reading
 Frank, Richard Nathan (1987). Lawry's Foods, Inc: A Blending of Dreams. Newcomen Society of the United States.

External links
Official website

Herb and spice mixtures
Edible salt